This article refers to crime in the U.S. state of Utah.

Statistics
In 2008 there were 98,457 crimes reported in Utah, including 40 murders. In 2014 there were 91,057 crimes reported, including 67 murders.

Capital punishment laws

Capital punishment is legal in the state of Utah. Aggravated murder is the only crime subject to the penalty of death under Utah law. Lethal injection is the state's method of choice; however, execution by firing squad is authorized if the drugs required for lethal injection are unobtainable, or if the inmate was sentenced before 2004 and chose firing squad as the method of execution.

References